Anton Joseph Binterim (19 September 1779, Düsseldorf – 17 May 1855, Düsseldorf-Bilk) was the parish priest of Bilk from 1805–55 and a prominent leader of Catholics in Prussia.  He lobbied against intermarriage between Catholics and Protestants.

References

External links
 Catholic Encyclopedia Article

1779 births
1855 deaths
19th-century German Roman Catholic priests
Clergy from Düsseldorf
Member of the Prussian National Assembly